A list of films produced in Belgium ordered by year of release. For an alphabetical list of Belgian films see :Category:Belgian films

Notes

External links
 Belgian film at the Internet Movie Database

19070s
1970s in Belgium
Belgian